Górniczy Klub Sportowy Górnik Łęczna, commonly referred to as Górnik Łęczna, is a sports club based in Łęczna, Poland. It is best known for its men's professional football team, which competes in I liga, the second division in the Polish football league system. The club also fields teams in women's football and wrestling.

History
The club was founded in 1979, as a club for the local coal miners. As the years went, the local Bogdanka Coal Mine decided to invest more and more money and as a result the club quickly rose through the leagues. The club shed its relative obscurity when it gained promotion to the Ekstraklasa in 2003.

Górnik Łęczna played in the top division from 2003 until 2007, when they were relegated to the 3rd division, as a consequence of their involvement in a match fixing scandal. However they were promoted straight back up as league winners after the 2007–08 season and competed in the I Liga for six years before winning promotion to the 2014–15 Ekstraklasa.

Since 1 January 2007, the men's football department has been operating as a business entity separate from the rest of the club.

In February 2011 the team was renamed GKS Bogdanka for sponsorship reasons, a decision from the local Bogdanka coal mine. As a result, a group of supporters opposing the name change formed an amateur team GKS Górnik 1979 Łęczna. On 23 July 2013 GKS Bogdanka's board of directors announced the return to the former name.

Honours
7th spot in Ekstraklasa: 2004–05
Polish Cup semi-final: 2022–23
Polish U-19 Bronze Medal: 2004, 2005

Current squad

Out on loan

GKS Górnik 1979 Łęczna

Górnik 1979 Łęczna was a club founded in 2011 by Górnik Łęczna fans who were unhappy with the name change to GKS Bogdanka. The club eventually changed its name back in 2013 but the fan owned counterpart has continued to operate in amateur football leagues. On 22 August 2014 the club withdrew from all competitions and ceased to operate, the reason cited were the lack of funds and the fact that the original Górnik Łęczna team went back to its original name scrapping the GKS Bogdanka name.

Women's section

The women's section of Górnik Łęczna played for years in the second and third tier leagues of Poland. In 2006–07 the team reached the semi-finals of the Polish Cup but lost to Medyk Konin. In the 2009–10 season with the expansion of the Ekstraliga Kobiet the team finally gained promotion to it by finishing second in its 2nd tier division. In its Ekstraliga debut Górnik was 5th.

See also
 Football in Poland
 List of football teams
 Champions' Cup/League
 UEFA Cup

References

External links

 Official website (Polish)
 Górnik Łęczna at the Fans website (Polish)
 Górnik Łęczna at 90minut.pl (Polish)

 
Football clubs in Poland
Association football clubs established in 1979
Mining association football clubs in Poland
1979 establishments in Poland